Microsoft Video 1 or MS-CRAM is an early lossy video compression and decompression algorithm (codec) that was released with version 1.0 of Microsoft's Video for Windows in November 1992. It is based on MotiVE, a vector quantization codec which Microsoft licensed from Media Vision. In 1993, Media Vision marketed the Pro Movie Spectrum, an ISA board that captured video in both raw and MSV1 formats (the MSV1 processing was done in hardware on the board).

Compression algorithm 
Microsoft Video 1 operates either in an 8-bit palettized color space or in a 15-bit RGB color space. Each frame is split into 4×4 pixel blocks. Each 4×4 pixel block can be coded in one of three modes: skip, 2-color or 8-color. In skip mode, the content from the previous frame is copied to the current frame in a conditional replenishment fashion. In 2-color mode, two colors per 4×4 block are transmitted, and 1 bit per pixel is used to select between the two colors. In 8-color mode, the same scheme applies with 2 colors per 2×2 block. This can be interpreted as a 2-color palette which is locally adapted on either a 4×4 block basis or a 2×2 block basis. Interpreted as vector quantization, vectors with components red, green, and blue are quantized using a forward adaptive codebook with two entries.

Use in NetShow Encoder 
The codec was available in Microsoft NetShow Encoder, which was later renamed Windows Media Encoder, and made available via the SDK. The NetShow encoder allowed the user to select a 2 pass option, where in the first pass the video was analyzed to create a color palette, and in the second pass converted to the palettized color space and encoded. Before encoding, the video could be scaled. Later versions of Windows Media Encoder dropped support for Microsoft Video 1 and only supported Windows Media Video.

See also 
 Indexed color
 Color quantization
 Block truncation coding, a similar coding technique for grayscale content
 Color Cell Compression, a similar coding technique for color content, based on block truncation coding
 Apple Video, a codec based on a similar design
 QuickTime Graphics, a codec based on a similar design
 Smacker video, a codec based on a similar design
 S3 Texture Compression, a texture compression format based on a similar design

References

External links 
 Microsoft Video 1 - MultimediaWiki
 Microsoft Video 1 decoder - FFmpeg
 Microsoft Video 1 encoder - FFmpeg

Video codecs
Film and video technology
Lossy compression algorithms
Microsoft proprietary codecs